Mark W. Ryan is a music editor for film and television, currently living in Los Angeles, California. A two-time winner of the Motion Picture Sound Editors Golden Reel Award, he has worked on films such as Liar Liar as well as many primetime television and animation shows. Also a singer and songwriter and an accomplished guitarist, Ryan began his entertainment career as a drummer in his hometown of Cleveland, Ohio. He earned a B.A. in music theory and percussion from Kent State University in 1983, and married before relocating to Los Angeles in 1986. He is also credited as a voice-over actor in the 1991 animated series Little Shop, based on the film Little Shop Of Horrors, in which he voiced the character Paine Driller.

Ryan has two children, Molly and Sean, and has widened his scope in recent years to include music composition and supervision for television and film. His most recent projects include the musical score for J. Pulk's short film Just For Sex, and the music promoting the NBA's 2009 Allstar Game 3D telecast from Phoenix, Arizona, as well as music editing on the Iron Man animated series for Marvel, slated to air on the Nicktoons network in the summer of 2009.

References

Kent State University alumni
Living people
Musicians from Cleveland
American sound editors
Year of birth missing (living people)